Threat Signal is the third official full-length studio album by the Canadian melodic death metal band Threat Signal.

Track listing

Credits
 Jon Howard – vocals
 Travis Montgomery – lead guitar
 Chris Feener – rhythm guitar
 Pat Kavanagh – bass
 Alex Rüdinger – drums

Personnel
 Produced, mixed and mastered by Zeuss
 Artwork and layout by Colin Marks

References

2011 albums
Threat Signal albums
Nuclear Blast albums